Richard Ben-Veniste (born January 3, 1943) is an American lawyer.  He first rose to prominence as a special prosecutor during the Watergate scandal. He has also been a member of the 9/11 Commission. He is known for his pointed questions and criticisms of members of both the Clinton and George W. Bush administrations. In 2017, he became a CNN Legal Analyst.

Career
Ben-Veniste was born to a Jewish family, his father of Levantine origin and his mother of Russian and German origin. He graduated from Stuyvesant High School in New York City (1960), earned an A.B. from Muhlenberg College in Allentown, Pennsylvania (1964), an LL.B. from Columbia Law School in New York City (1967), and an LL.M. from Northwestern University School of Law in Chicago, Illinois (1968).

He was an assistant U.S. attorney (1968–1973) in the Southern District of New York, and chief of the Special Prosecutions section, (1971–1973). He became a leading Watergate prosecutor, as chief of the Watergate Task Force of the Watergate Special Prosecutor's Office, (1973–1975).

He was the Democrats' chief counsel (1995–1996) on the Senate Whitewater Committee which investigated a variety of allegations involving Bill and Hillary Clinton. He argued that the Clintons did no wrong in connection with their investment in a failed land development project named Whitewater, or in their other Arkansas business affairs, nor did they commit violations of law after Mr. Clinton became president.

Ben-Veniste was a presidential appointee (2000) to the Nazi War Crimes and Japanese Imperial Government Records Interagency Working Group, which ultimately declassified some 8 million documents relating to war crimes in the World War II and post-war era.

9/11 Commission 
Ben-Veniste was a member (2002) of the National Commission on Terrorist Attacks Upon the United States (or "9/11  Commission"), where he developed a reputation for asking tough questions and demanding access to sensitive documents, although in some circles he was accused of grandstanding. His interrogation of U.S. Secretary of State Condoleezza Rice was contentious, and led to the declassification of the previously secret August 6, 2001, President's Daily Brief: "Bin Laden Determined to Attack Inside the United States." The 9/11 Commission's report was published in 2004 and has been read by millions of readers worldwide.

Ben-Veniste was a partner of the Washington, D.C., law firm of Melrod, Redman & Gartlan (1975–1981). In 1981 he formed Ben-Veniste and Shennoff, where he practiced for 10 years.  He joined Weil, Gotshal and Manges in 1991, where he was a partner until 2002. Ben-Veniste has been a partner at Mayer Brown LLP from 2002 until the present.

Works
 Richard Ben-Veniste and George Frampton, Stonewall: The Real Story of the Watergate Prosecution Simon & Schuster, 1977, 
 Richard Ben-Veniste, The Emperor's New Clothes: Exposing the Truth from Watergate to 9/11 Thomas Dunne Books, 2009,

References

External links

Living people
1943 births
Columbia Law School alumni
Northwestern University Pritzker School of Law alumni
Stuyvesant High School alumni
Muhlenberg College alumni
Lawyers from Washington, D.C.
New York (state) lawyers
American prosecutors
Jewish American attorneys
21st-century Sephardi Jews
United States Senate lawyers
Washington, D.C., Democrats
New York (state) Democrats
Whitewater controversy
Watergate scandal investigators
CNN people
People associated with Mayer Brown